Dushanbe Railway Station is a train station located in Dushanbe, Tajikistan.

History 
The history of the Dushanbe railway station begins in 1936, although the first train to Dushanbe arrived on September 10, 1929. The first train from Moscow arrived in Stalinabad on December 29, 1950. The new station was built in 1963 and is still operating. In 1962, the first diesel locomotive TE2 (diesel locomotive with electric transmission), which was produced in Kharkov from 1948 to 1955, arrived from Tashkent to Dushanbe.
Today, the station receives hundreds of thousands of passengers a year, and in general, Tajik Railways serve about half a million passengers.

Trains
Four pairs of trains run from the station:
Dushanbe - Pakhtaabad (daily)
Dushanbe - Shaartuz / Kulob (on Tuesdays and Saturdays)
Dushanbe - Moscow (on Tuesdays and Saturdays) Customs control is carried out by Tajik border guards directly when boarding a train.
Kulyab - Moscow (on Thursdays) - cruised through Dushanbe until in 2016-2018.

See also
Rail transport in Tajikistan

References

Railway stations in Tajikistan
Railway stations opened in 1929